Oshirogo (御城碁 "castle Go") or castle games were official matches of high-level Go played in Japan during the Edo period, usually in the castles of the shōgun. Players were mostly from the four go houses.

Matches were played in the shōgun'''s presence. With the passage of the years, this became a formality: the players would replay a game that had already been played, and the shōgun would often be represented by an official, rather than attend himself. The games themselves were, though, bitterly contested, since the castle games had a major effect on the prestige of the four houses. Throughout the Tokugawa shogunate there was an ongoing struggle to take control of the official positions of Meijin and godokoro''.

Hundreds of game records of the castle games survive; a large collection was edited by Kensaku Segoe.

The game series was suspended in 1862 as the political situation became tense. Apart from one 1863 game between Hayashi Hakuei and Yasui Sanei, it was never resumed.

External links
Sensei's Library page

History of Go